Gandee is a surname. Notable people with the surname include:

 John Gandee (1909–1994), British diplomat, High Commissioner to Botswana
 Sonny Gandee (1929–2013), American football player

See also
 Gandy (surname)
 Gandhi (surname)